The 1931–32 Rugby Union County Championship was the 39th edition of England's premier rugby union club competition at the time.

Gloucestershire won the competition for the eighth time (and third in succession) after defeating Durham County in the final.

Semifinals

Final

See also
 English rugby union system
 Rugby union in England

References

Rugby Union County Championship
County Championship (rugby union) seasons